Joe Henderson (April 24, 1937 – October 25, 1964) was an American R&B and gospel singer, best known for his 1962 recording of "Snap Your Fingers".

Henderson was born in Como, Mississippi, United States, and raised in Gary, Indiana.  After working in gospel music, he signed with Todd Records in 1958.  In 1962, he recorded "Snap Your Fingers" which became a big hit on both the pop and R&B chart. He charted three other sides within the next two years, "Big Love" [Todd 1077, 1962], "The Searching Is Over" [Todd 1079, 1962], and "You Take One Step (I'll Take Two) [Todd 1096, 1964]. In between the latter two, he continued recording without further chart success.

"You Take One Step (I'll Take Two)" proved to be Henderson's last chart hit, as he died on October 25, 1964, of a heart attack at the age of 27, at his apartment in Nashville, Tennessee.

See also
27 Club

References

1937 births
1964 deaths
People from Como, Mississippi
Musicians from Gary, Indiana
American rhythm and blues singers
American gospel singers
20th-century American singers